Youssef bin Ali Al Idrissi is a Saudi intelligence officer. He was appointed deputy intelligence chief in October 2012 replacing Abdulaziz bin Bandar in the post. Al Idrissi was named the director of the General Intelligence Directorate in April 2014. He was succeeded by Khalid bin Ali Al Humaidan in 2015.

In March 2020 Al Idrissi was detained due to his alleged involvement in a coup against Crown Prince Mohammed bin Salman.

References

Living people
Directors of Al Mukhabarat Al A'amah
Year of birth missing (living people)